António Ginestal Machado (3 May 1873 – 28 June 1940) was a Portuguese politician. He was born in Almeida, graduated in Law at the University of Coimbra and became a high-school teacher. A member of the moderate Republican Union, he was one of the promoters of its fusion with the Evolutionist Party which originated the Republican Liberal Party. He was President of the Ministry (Prime Minister), from 15 November to 14 December 1923, in a minority government. He resigned due to the opposition of President Manuel Teixeira Gomes of dissolving the parliament, after an insurrection attempt. He died in Santarém.

References

1873 births
1940 deaths
People from Guarda District
Prime Ministers of Portugal
University of Coimbra alumni